Gerhard Albert Ritter (29 March 1929 – 20 June 2015) was a German historian.

Biography 
Ritter was born in and grew up in Berlin and studied from 1947 at the University of Tübingen and at the Free University of Berlin. He died in Berlin in 2015.

Honors 
 Honorary Fellow of St. Antony's College Oxford
 B. Lit. of Oxford University
 Honorary degree of University of Bielefeld
 Honorary degree of the Philosophischen Fakultät I of Humboldt-Universität zu Berlin (1999)
 Preis des Historischen Kollegs 2007
 Großes Bundesverdienstkreuz (2008)

Work
 Der Sozialstaat. Entstehung und Entwicklung im internationalen Vergleich. Oldenbourg Verlag, München 1991, 
 Über Deutschland. Die Bundesrepublik in der deutschen Geschichte. C. H. Beck Verlag, München 1999, 
 Der Preis der Einheit. Die Wiedervereinigung und die Krise des Sozialstaats. C. H. Beck Verlag, München 2006, 
 Friedrich Meinecke: Akademischer Lehrer und emigrierte Schüler. Briefe und Aufzeichnungen. 1910–1977. Oldenbourg Verlag, München 2006,  (= Biographische Quellen zur Zeitgeschichte. 23)
 Wir sind das Volk! Wir sind ein Volk! Geschichte der deutschen Einigung. C. H. Beck Verlag, München 2009, .

References
 Klaus Hildebrand: Laudatio auf Gerhard A. Ritter. In: Historische Zeitschrift, Bd. 286 (2008), 2, S. 281–288.
 Jürgen Kocka, Hans-Jürgen Puhle und Klaus Tenfelde: Von der Arbeiterbewegung zum modernen Sozialstaat. Festschrift für Gerhard A. Ritter zum 65. Geburtstag, München 1994, 
 Andreas Helle, Söhnke Schreyer und Marcus Gräser: Disziplinargeschichte und Demokratiegeschichte. Zur Entwicklung von Politik- und Geschichtswissenschaft in Deutschland nach 1945. Ein Gespräch mit Gerhard A. Ritter. In: Marcus Gräser (Hrsg.): Staat, Nation, Demokratie. Traditionen und Perspektiven moderner Gesellschaften. Festschrift für Hans-Jürgen Puhle, Göttingen 2001, S. 270–278, .
 Rüdiger Hohls und Konrad H. Jarausch (Hrsg.): Versäumte Fragen. Deutsche Historiker im Schatten des Nationalsozialismus. DVA, Stuttgart 2000, S. 118–143 und 467 (Interview online)

Endnotes

1929 births
2015 deaths
Commanders Crosses of the Order of Merit of the Federal Republic of Germany
20th-century German historians
German male non-fiction writers
Academic staff of the University of Münster
Writers from Berlin
21st-century German historians